Ian McIntosh is a Zimbabwean rugby union coach. He served as head coach for the Springboks during 1993 and 1994.

McIntosh grew up near Bulawayo.

McIntosh never played for his country as a player but became acquainted with coaching in the 1970s under the tutelage of the then Welsh Rugby Union coaching director Ray Williams.

Teams Coached

National
He later took charge of the former Zimbabwe national rugby union team, although his biggest achievement to date was taking charge of the South African national side.

The year before the 1995 World Cup he was sacked as national coach following a series defeat to the All Blacks in New Zealand in mid-1994. In October of that year, Kitch Christie accepted an offer to take over from McIntosh.

Natal rugby and the Sharks
He coached the legendary  team during the late 1980s and early 1990s. He became a national figure after Natal won their first Currie Cup in 1990, their centenary year. His success with Natal led to him coaching the Springbok side.

Four-time Currie Cup winner as Coach.

The Sharks have named their main entrance gate at Kings Park after former coach Ian McIntosh.

In popular culture
The Ian McIntosh Story is a Supersport documentary available on Showmax, 'In bestowing the prestigious Vernon Pugh Award for Distinguished Service in 2013, World Rugby lauded Ian for his outstanding coaching and management, this is his story'.

Further reading
  John Bishop, 2000, Mac The Face Of Rugby, Don Nelson Publishers South Africa.   (This book is about McIntosh's coaching career in South Africa from 1990 to 1999.)

References
Two more coaches will attend rugby meeting
McIntosh ready to reign on Parade
Sharks honour Ian McIntosh by renaming Kings Park entrance gate

External links
South Africa Rugby
Scrum
Springboks Legends for Hartsfield Rugby celebrations
Exclusive: Joost van der Westhuizen, Bok legend

Year of birth missing (living people)
Living people
Sportspeople from Bulawayo
Zimbabwean rugby union coaches
Zimbabwean rugby union players
Zimbabwean expatriates in South Africa
Zimbabwean people of Scottish descent
South Africa national rugby union team coaches